Nina Menkova (born 25 December 1945) is a Russian equestrian. She competed in two events at the 1988 Summer Olympics.

References

External links
 

1945 births
Living people
Russian female equestrians
Russian dressage riders
Soviet female equestrians
Olympic equestrians of the Soviet Union
Equestrians at the 1988 Summer Olympics
Sportspeople from Yekaterinburg